Power ring or ring(s) of power may refer to:

Fictional entities 
 Power ring (DC Comics), an object featured in comic books
 Power Ring (character), several comic-book characters
 Rings of Power, fictional artifacts from J. R. R. Tolkien's Middle-earth legendarium
 Rings (Sonic the Hedgehog), an element in the video game series Sonic the Hedgehog

Media 
 Rings of Power (video game), for the Sega Genesis/Mega Drive
 Rock & Rule (known as Ring of Power outside North America), a 1983 film
 The Lord of the Rings: The Rings of Power, a 2022 Amazon television series set in Tolkien's Middle-earth
 "The Ring of Powers", a 2011 episode of Ugly Americans

See also 

 Great Ring (disambiguation)
 Magic ring, mythical jewellery
 Ring (disambiguation)
 Ring circuit, an electrical wiring technique